Auguste Maltais (16 January 1916 – 7 May 1988) was a Liberal party member of the House of Commons of Canada. He was an accountant by career.

He was first elected at the Charlevoix riding in the 1949 general election. Maltais was re-elected for successive terms in 1953 and 1957. In the 1958 election, he was defeated by Martial Asselin of the Progressive Conservative party. Maltais made one further attempt at a House of Commons seat in the 1962 election but was again unsuccessful.

External links
 

1916 births
1988 deaths
Members of the House of Commons of Canada from Quebec
Liberal Party of Canada MPs
Canadian accountants